Johann Balthasar Neumann (27 January 1687 (?) – 19 August 1753), usually known as Balthasar Neumann, was a German architect and military artillery engineer who developed a refined brand of Baroque architecture, fusing Austrian, Bohemian, Italian, and French elements to design some of the most impressive buildings of the period, including the Würzburg Residence and the Basilica of the Fourteen Holy Helpers (called Vierzehnheiligen in German).

The Würzburg Residence is considered one of the most beautiful and well proportioned palaces in Europe and the Basilica of the Fourteen Holy Helpers is considered by some as the crowning work of the period.

Early life

Neumann was born in Eger, Kingdom of Bohemia, now known as Cheb, Czech Republic, in January 1687. He was the seventh of nine children of cloth-maker Hans Christoph Neumann (d. 1713) and his wife Rosina (1645–1707). Neumann was baptized on 30 January 1687.

His first apprenticeship was spent working at a bell and gun foundry in Eger. However, during his Journeyman years he came to Würzburg in 1711. In 1712 he attended lessons on geometry, architecture and land surveying and joined the local military, in which he remained until his death, then holding the rank of colonel of the artillery. He created measurement instruments (1712, Deutsches Museum/Munich and 1713, Mainfränkisches Museum, Würzburg), a map of Würzburg (1715, copy at the War Archive, Munich) and some drawings for a new abbey at Ebrach Abbey (1716, now lost).

In 1717 he served in the Austro–Turkish War, advancing with his unit from Vienna to Belgrade. In 1718 he travelled through northern Italy to study buildings and briefly worked on civilian construction projects at Milan (details not known).

Service for the Prince-Bishops of Würzburg

Neumann's career as an architect took off under Johann Philipp Franz von Schönborn, Prince-Bishop of Würzburg, who asked the young engineer in 1719 to plan, and in 1720 to lead construction of, his new palace, the Würzburg Residence. Although other architects participated, Neumann was able to give the project his personal imprint, which became his life's work.

The second task for the Prince-Bishop was the Schönbornkapelle of Würzburg Cathedral (from 1721). In 1723 Neumann traveled and studied in France. At Paris and Versailles he met with royal architects Germain Boffrand and Robert de Cotte and consulted them on the Würzburg projects. Back at Würzburg, Neumann started to build a hunting lodge known as Mädelhofen (1724, unfinished, demolished in 1725).

In 1725, Neumann married Maria Eva Engelberts (1704–45). They had three sons and 5 daughters.

Under von Schönborn's successor, Christoph Franz von Hutten (1673–1729) he was less busy at Wurzburg and mainly worked for various abbeys. His new church at Münsterschwarzach Abbey (after 1727, demolished after 1821) laid the groundwork for his fame as a builder of churches. Another work of this period was the church at Kloster Holzkirchen (1728–30) where he combined features of the French, Italian and German Baroque.

The next Prince-Bishop was Friedrich Karl von Schönborn (1674–1746), who also was Prince-Bishop of Bamberg. As Reichsvizekanzler von Schönborn lived at  the imperial court at Vienna until 1734. He named Neumann director of all military, civilian and ecclesiastical construction in both bishoprics and in 1729 and 1739 ordered him to Vienna, where he exchanged views with Johann Lukas von Hildebrandt, von Schönborn's architect, whose influence is visible in some parts of the Residence and also at the hunting lodge of Werneck (after 1733).

As chief engineer of the joint Hochstifts, Neumann was responsible for overseeing fortifications, transport and water engineering and for improving urban planning in practical and aesthetical terms. From 1731 he also taught military and civilian architecture at Würzburg University.

Neumann also worked for Damian Hugo Philipp von Schönborn (1676–1743) and Franz Georg von Schönborn (1682–1756). Neumann built the Corps de Logis of the Schloss Bruchsal (after 1731), with its notable stairway. In the same town, he also designed the church of St. Peter (1740–1746) which was to be the burial site for the Prince-Bishops of Speyer. Among his work for the Elector of Trier are the Dikasterialgebäude of Ehrenbreitstein Fortress (1739–1748) and the summer palace Schönbornslust (1748–1752, demolished 1806) at Kesselheim, also near Koblenz.

This work in turn led to Neumann being contacted for further work in the west of Germany. Out of many mooted projects only the stairway and New Apartments of the Brühl Palace (from 1743). Plans he made for the ducal palace at Stuttgart (after 1747), for Schwetzingen Palace (1749) and the Residence at Karlsruhe (after 1750) were never implemented.

As a builder of churches, Neumann recurred to Guarino Guarini, the architecture of his native Bohemia and its transmittance to Franconia by Johann Dientzenhofer. He emphasized the use of the rotunda as a central feature of his churches. This reached its pinnacle at Vierzehnheiligen (after 1742) and Neresheim (after 1747).

One of his last large projects was a rebuilding of the Hofburg Palace at Vienna (after 1746), which was not put into practice, however.

Neumann worked on St. Paulinus' Church in Trier, designing most of the internal elements.

Death and legacy
He died in Würzburg on 19 August 1753 and is buried at the Marienkapelle there.

The final German 50 Deutsche Mark note showed a picture of him together with the famous staircase located in the Residence of Würzburg. Neumann was also depicted by Tiepolo in the ceiling fresco above the stairway of the Residence, in pseudo-military uniform, leaning over a cannon. He had boasted that the ceiling was so well constructed that not even the roar of a cannon would make the roof fall.

Other works

 Heidenheim, Propsteigebäude of the Augustinerchorherren, 1723–33; 
 Bamberg, Katharinenspital, 1729–38; 
 Bamberg, Domkapitelhaus, 1730–33; 
 Bamberg, Klerikalseminar, 1731–37; 
 Gößweinstein, Wallfahrtskirche, 1730–39; 
 Schloss Seehof, Orangerie, 1733–37; 
 Worms, high altar of Worms Cathedral, 1738–40; 
 Heusenstamm, parish church, 1739–44; 
 Würzburg, several buildings after 1719, incl. Geschäftshaus am Marktplatz, 1739-41; 
 Würzburg, Augustinerkirche, 1741–44; 
 Würzburg, Käppele, 1748–49; 
 Kitzingen-Etwashausen, Kreuzkapelle, 1741–45;
 Gaibach, parish church, 1742–45; 
 Mainz, Jesuitenkirche, 1742-46 (demolished 1805); 
 Oberzell, abbey and convent building, 1744–60;
 Maria Limbach, pilgrimage church, 1751-55 (final project).

References

Further reading
 Manuel Weinberger: "Verschollen geglaubtes Planmaterial von Balthasar Neumann und seinem Baubüro, und eine unbekannte Zeichnung aus dem Umfeld Johann Dientzenhofers", in: RIHA Journal 0003 [14 April 2010], http://www.riha-journal.org/articles/2010/weinberger-planmaterial-balthasar-neumann (accessed 15 April 2010).

External links

 Online edition of Balthasar Neumanns Briefe der Reise nach Frankreich (1723) by the research project ARCHITRAVE
Biography at NDB 
Johann Balthasar Neumann featured on the 50 Deutsche Mark banknote from 1991.
 Encyclopedia of World Biography

1687 births
1753 deaths
18th-century German architects
German Baroque architects
German Bohemian people
German people of German Bohemian descent
People from Cheb
18th-century German engineers
Rococo architects
Engineers from Bavaria
Architects of Roman Catholic churches